The Ministry of Emergency Situations of Armenia (MES) is a government agency overseeing the civil emergency services in Armenia. The ministry was formed by presidential decree on 21 April 2008.

History
The ministry was preceded by the Headquarters of the Civil Defense, which has operated in the Armenian SSR since 1961. The 1988 Armenian earthquake (also commonly known as the Spitak Earthquake) revealed many issues related to the civil defense system in Soviet Armenia and became the main force behind the restructuring of the Emergency Management Department of the Government of Armenia. Following the Declaration of State Sovereignty of Armenia by the Supreme Council of Armenia, the Emergency Department was established with Stepan Badalyan its first head. On September 4, 1997, a rescue rapid reaction unit is created, with its main tasks being to perform rescue operations in the disaster zone, as well as rendering professional assistance to the population in case of emergency incidents in the shortest possible time. In 1994, Armenia became a full member of the International Civil Defence Organization. In December 2005, the Emergency Management Department was renamed to the Rescue Service of the Ministry of Territorial Administration of the Republic of Armenia.

Newly elected Armenian President Serzh Sargsyan restructured the service on 21 April 2008 as the Ministry of Emergency Situations, with Mher Shahgeldyan being the first Minister of Emergency Situations. The ministry was merged with the Ministry of Territorial Administration in December 2014 only to become an independent agency two years later.

Mission and structure 
The Ministry of Emergency Situations of Armenia coordinates its services with the law of the Republic of Armenia in the sphere of citizenship and protection of citizens in the context of emergency situations. It serves to evacuate Armenian citizens during natural disasters and accidents.

The ministry is composed of 5 main agencies:

 Rescue Service
 National Seismic Protection Service
 Armgosgidromet
 State Reserves Agency
 National Center for Technical Security

Rescue Service
The Rescue Service is an auxiliary to the Armed Forces of Armenia. The ministry utilizes Stepanavan Airport in Lori Province to support the rescue services by fighting wildfires. Fire-fighting aircraft based there includes Beriev Be-200 aircraft, which is in the process of being purchased by the Russian government.

National Seismic Protection Service
The National Seismic Protection Service is engaged in seismic risk assessment as well as earthquake impact assessment. It has offices in Gyumri, Yerevan, Kapan, and Stepanakert. The service operates seismic stations at the Metsamor Nuclear Power Plant, the only nuclear power plant in the South Caucasus.

Armgosgidromet
The Service of the Hydrometeorology and Active Influence on Atmospheric Phenomena (SNCO) or Armgosgidromet is the national meteorological service of Armenia, responsible for gathering hydrometeorological information.

State Reserves Agency
The State Reserves Agency of the Ministry of Emergency Situations is the legal successor of Armenian SSR branch of the Soviet Material Reserves State Committee (now the Federal Agency for State Reserves).It was founded in 1992 when by government decision the Armenian branch was reformed into State Reserves Administration. In 2002, it began operating under the Ministry of Finance. It moved in 2005 under the structure of the Ministry of Territorial Administration. Before becoming part of MES in 2008.

National Center for Technical Security
The National Center of Technical Security is a non-commercial organization founded on 29 December 2005.

Symbols

Medals 
The ministry provides 9 awards for exceptional employees of the ministry.

 Medal "Cross of Glory Noah"
 Medal "For the Commonwealth in the Name of Salvation"
 Medal "For impeccable service"
 Medal "The best fireman-rescuer"
 Medal "The brave rescuer"
 Medal "Honored Employee of the Ministry of Emergency Situations of the Republic of Armenia"
 Medal "Prevention, assistance, rescue"
 Medal "Veteran of the Ministry of Emergency Situations of the Republic of Armenia"
 Badge "First class rescuer"

Music 
Like the Armenian Army and the Police of Armenia, the rescue service of the ministry has a 48 member, ceremonial brass band (Poghatin Nvagaxumb) which works during public ceremonies involving the ministry. It is led by Colonel Manvel Utujyan, who previously served in the band of the Internal Troops. The brass band was founded in 2010 by Minister Armen Yeritsyan.

List of ministers

1991–2008
 Major General Vyacheslav Harutyunyan (July 1997 – February 2001)
 Major General Hmayak Aroyan (February 2001 – March 2004) 
 Major General Edik Barseghyan (March 2004 – 21 April 2008)

2008–Present
 Mher Shahgeldyan (21 April 2008 – March 2010)
 Armen Yeritsyan (March 2010 – 13 December 2016) (Died in office)
 David Tonoyan (6 February 2017 – 10 May 2018)
Hrachya Rostomyan (10 May 2018 – 3 October 2018)
 Vacant (3 – 4 October 2018)
 Feliks Tsolakyan (4 October 2018 – 20 November 2020)
 Andranik Piloyan (20 November 2020 - 1 April 2022)
 Armen Pambukhchyan (12 April 2022 - Present)

See also 
 Government of Armenia
State Service of Emergency Situations
 Ministry of Emergency Situations (disambiguation)

References

External links 
Armenian Ministry of Emergency Situations
Ministry of Emergency Situations channel on YouTube
Poghatin nvagaxumb on YouTube
ՓՈՂԱՅԻՆ ՆՎԱԳԱԽՄԲԵՐԻ ՇՔԵՐԹ ԵՐԵՎԱՆՈՒՄ on YouTube

Government ministries of Armenia
Ministries established in 2008
2008 establishments in Armenia